Al-Tulay'i (also spelled Tli'i) is a village in northwestern Syria, administratively part of the Tartus Governorate, southeast of Tartus. Nearby localities include Buwaydet al-Suwayqat to the north, al-Sisiniyah and al-Mitras to the northeast, Arzuna to the south, Kafr Fo to the southwest and al-Safsafah to the west. According to the Syria Central Bureau of Statistics (CBS), al-Sisiniyah had a population of 2,123 in the 2004 census. Its inhabitants are predominantly Alawites.

References

Populated places in Safita District
Alawite communities in Syria